Mesola is a comune (municipality) in the Province of Ferrara in the Italian region Emilia-Romagna, located about  northeast of Bologna and about  east of Ferrara.

Mesola borders the following municipalities: Ariano nel Polesine, Berra, Codigoro, Goro.

One of the landmarks in the town is the Castle of Mesola, built between 1578 and 1583, mainly used as a hunting lodge by the Este dynasty. It now houses the civic library and the Museum of the Wood and Deer of Mesola.

Demographic evolution

References

External links
 www.comune.mesola.fe.it/

Cities and towns in Emilia-Romagna